Platt Bridge railway station is a closed railway station in the Platt Bridge area of Wigan, England, where the line bridged Liverpool Road (the A58).

Platt Bridge was in the historic county of Lancashire.

History
The station was opened by the London and North Western Railway on 1 September 1864, in common with other stations on the Manchester to Wigan Line.

The station joined the London Midland and Scottish Railway during the Grouping in 1923 and passed to the London Midland Region of British Railways on nationalisation in 1948.

The station closed on 1 May 1961.

Coal deposits were the chief motivation for building a railway in the area and the railway's supporters included many local colliery owners and industrialists.

References
Notes

Sources

External links
 The station on a 1948 OS map via npe maps
 Line and mileages via Railwaycodes

Disused railway stations in the Metropolitan Borough of Wigan
Former London and North Western Railway stations
Railway stations in Great Britain opened in 1864
History of Wigan
Railway stations in Great Britain closed in 1961